River Ridge is the name of some places in the U.S. state of Alabama:

River Ridge, Monroe County, Alabama
River Ridge, Pike County, Alabama, an unincorporated community in Pike County, Alabama